Rollercoaster is the second studio album to be released by British band Let Loose, released on 23 September 1996. It was supported by a small UK tour, it is the last studio album to be recorded by the original line-up of the band, and features the band's second biggest hit, "Make It with You". The album also spawned the singles "Everybody Say Everybody Do", "Take it Easy" and "Darling Be Home Soon". The album was released as a limited edition in Japan with alternate cover artwork.

Background
The band embarked on a UK tour following the release of their debut album, and after a seven-month hiatus, returned with a new single - "Everybody Say Everybody Do" - which peaked at #29. Another seven months passed before a new single was released - a cover of the Bread track "Make It with You". The single reached #7 and gave the group their third Top 10 success. This was followed with "'Take It Easy" which peaked at #25.

The album Rollercoaster was released in September 1996, and peaked at #42, with sales of less than 30,000 copies. Two months later, a final single was released from the album in time for the Christmas market, but "Darling Be Home Soon" became one of the band's lowest charting singles reaching #65, and the band split up shortly afterwards. Wermerling joined the band Bottlefly, Rob Jeffrey continued playing guitar in other projects and Lee Murray became a DJ, session drummer, and has worked in management with Holly Valance, Kelly Brook and Page 3 model Keeley Hazell.

Track listing

Charts

References

1996 albums
Let Loose albums
Mercury Records albums